Stenoptilodes gielisi is a moth of the family Pterophoridae that is known from the Galápagos Islands.

Adults are on wing in May.

External links

gielisi
Moths described in 1993